Ednaswap is the first album by Los Angeles band Ednaswap, released in 1995 by East West Records.

Natalie Imbruglia covered the song "Torn" for her 1997 debut album Left of the Middle. Sinéad O'Connor covered the song "The State I'm In" for her 2000 album Faith and Courage.  American-Norwegian singer Trine Rein covered both songs for her 1996 album Beneath My Skin.

Track listing

References 

Ednaswap albums
1995 debut albums
Albums produced by Matt Wallace
East West Records albums